Sõjamäe (Estonian for "War Hill") is a subdistrict in the district of Lasnamäe, Tallinn, the capital of Estonia. It has a population of 140.

Sõjamäe has a bus station named "Vesse".

Gallery

See also
Tallinn Airport
Ülemiste City

References

Subdistricts of Tallinn